Barro (Spanish and Portuguese for mud or clay) may refer to:

Arts, entertainment, and media
 Barro Humano, a 1929 Brazilian film
 El Dios de barro, a 1970 Mexican telenovela
 Entre el barro, a 1939 Argentine musical film
 Barro, a 1951 Honduran novel by Paca Navas

People
 Aboubacar Barro (born 1991), Burkinabé professional footballer
 Adama Barro (born 1996), Burkinabé international footballer
 Analyn Barro (born 1996), Filipina actress and model
 Andrés do Barro (1947–1989), Spanish singer-songwriter
 Joaquín Barro (born 2001), Argentinian professional football player
 Josh Barro (born 1984), American journalist
 Juan Barro (born 1956), Spanish former swimmer
 Oumar Barro (born 1974), Burkinabé former professional football player 
 Ousmane Barro (born 1984), Senegalese professional basketball player
 Robert Barro (born 1944), American classical liberal macroeconomist

Places

Europe
 Barro, Charente, France, a commune
 Barrô (Águeda), Aveiro, Portugal, a civil parish
 Barro (Llanes), Asturias, Spain, a civil parish
 Barro, Galicia, Spain, a municipality
 Gejuelo del Barro, Castile and León, Spain, a village and municipality

North America
 Barro, Utah, United States, a ghost town
 Barro Blanco Dam, a gravity dam on the Tabasara River in Chiriqui, Panama
 Barro Colorado Island, Panama, an island in the Panama Canal

South America
 Barro, Ceará, Brazil, a municipality 
 Barro Alto, Bahia, Brazil, a municipality
 Barro Alto, Goiás, Brazil, a municipality
 Barro Negro (volcano), a scoria cone in Jujuy, Argentina
 Barro Preto, Bahia, Brazil, a municipality

Other uses
 Barro negro pottery, a type of black pottery from Mexico

See also
 Barros
 Barrow (disambiguation)